Sader is a surname. Notable people with this surname include:

 Alan Sader (born 1940), American actor
 Emir Sader (born 1943), Brazilian sociologist
 Maroun Khoury Sader (1926–2015), Lebanese archeparch
 Steve Sader (died 1946), American football player